Mix FM is a radio station that serves Fiji, broadcasting on the FM band at the frequencies of 93.8 MHz in Lautoka, Nadi and Suva and 93.6 MHz in Ba, Tavua, Rakiraki and Sigatoka. This station is licensed to broadcast all over Fiji.  As of 6 February 2011, Mix FM has introduced Radio Data System (RDS) on its 93.8 MHz frequency in the West. RDS for Suva was introduced on 10 February.  On 9 September 2011, MixFM started broadcasting in Sigatoka on 93.6 MHz.

A live webcast has been available since June 2011 and can be found at http://live.mix94.fm/

On 30 June, MixFM changed its frequencies from 94.0 to 93.8 and 88.6 to 93.6 as per Government requirement.

Hosts and Shows
Weekdays

Saturday

Sunday

External links
Mix FM (Fiji) website
Mix FM Facebook Page

Classic hits radio stations
Radio stations in Fiji